Arthur Jeffery Mickel (born August 4, 1966) is a former American football offensive lineman. He was drafted out of Eastern Washington by the Minnesota Vikings in 1989, and made his NFL debut for the Los Angeles Rams in 1990. He later played in the World League for the Barcelona Dragons and Frankfurt Galaxy.

References 

1966 births
Living people
American football offensive tackles
Eastern Washington Eagles football players
Los Angeles Rams players
Barcelona Dragons players
Frankfurt Galaxy players
Players of American football from Maine
People from Limestone, Maine